Maja Tucholke (born 11 February 1979, in Leipzig) is a German rower.

References

 

1979 births
Living people
German female rowers
Sportspeople from Leipzig
Rowers at the 2004 Summer Olympics
Olympic rowers of Germany
World Rowing Championships medalists for Germany
21st-century German women
20th-century German women